ARM Veracruz (PO-154) is a  in service with the Mexican Navy with a 57 mm main gun turret and a helicopter landing pad, currently primarily used to fight drug cartels. It is also armed with SA-18 Grouse missiles. Like other ships of this class, it was designed and built in Mexican dockyards, and is sometimes referred to as a compact frigate.

External links

References

Durango-class patrol vessels
Ships built in Mexico
2000 ships